The Resource Group Pakistan, known as TRG Pakistan, is a Pakistani venture capital company which invests in business process outsourcing companies and is based in Karachi, Pakistan. It was founded in 2002.

The company is owned by TRG International and about 86% of the revenue is earned from Ibex.

It has a presence in more than seven countries. The company has more than 20,000 employees in 26 sites.

History
In 2014, the company announced that they will employ 800 people in Spring Hill, Tennessee.

In 2018, the company closed its call center facility at Indiana Mall laid off 105 employees. In the same year, they filed for an IPO and listing on the NASDAQ.

In 2020, the Securities & Exchange Commission of Pakistan requested that the Pakistan Stock Exchange raise an inquiry to investigate alleged insider trading.

References

Business process outsourcing companies
Companies based in Karachi
Pakistani companies established in 2002
Business services companies established in 2002
Companies listed on the Pakistan Stock Exchange
Pakistani subsidiaries of foreign companies
2018 initial public offerings